Timon nevadensis, the Sierra Nevada lizard, is a species of lizard in the family Lacertidae. It is endemic to Spain. It is sometimes considered a subspecies of the ocellated lizard.

References

Timon (genus)
Reptiles described in 1963